Diner Dash is a strategy and time management video game initially developed by Gamelab and published by PlayFirst. It is now owned and published by Glu Mobile. It was one of the top-selling downloadable games of all-time, available in multiple platforms such as PC, Mac, consoles, and mobile.

An Xbox Live Arcade version of the game was released by Hudson Soft on November 18, 2009, the PlayStation Network version on November 25, 2009, the WiiWare version on February 16, 2010, in Japan, as well as Europe on March 26, 2010, and North America on March 29, 2010, but this version is no longer on the WiiWare service. Diner Dash later became a mobile game when ported to mobile phones by Glu Mobile, given a retail release, and made available via a 100% advertising-supported download. Versions have been created for the platforms PlayStation Portable, Nintendo DS, and iOS.

Diner Dash is also used to refer to the Diner Dash franchise, which has spawned numerous sequels. Diner Dash 2: Restaurant Rescue was released in early 2006, Diner Dash: Flo on the Go was released in late 2006, Diner Dash: Hometown Hero was released in late 2007, Diner Dash 5: BOOM! was released in early 2010, the first free-to-play Diner Dash, went live in late 2014, and the latest installment, Diner Dash Adventures, was released in 2019.

Story
Flo is a hard worker at a big stock market company in Dinertown. She's tired of doing all the work and feeling unfulfilled. Flo quits her job, wishing she could work someplace else. She spots a run-down old diner, which she buys. She has to make enough money to fix up the diner. Later after earning more finance, she opens a new restaurant called Flo's Tiki Palace, after earning enough there she then opens a seaside diner called Go with the Flo Fine Seafood Dining, when finished at the seaside diner she opens a dazzling newer restaurant called Chez Flo's.

After establishing many restaurants, an Indian goddess grants Flo a brand-new form and allows her to work at an Indian restaurant located above Dinertown. After proving her worth, Flo went out in her own separate way and is ready to help another hard worker at the company establish his own diner, repeating the cycle.

Gameplay
Gameplay involves seating customers and guiding Flo around the restaurant to serve customers. If enough money is earned after each level, the player progresses to the next. As the game progresses Flo updates the dilapidated restaurant she begins with and builds three further restaurants, which provide new settings.

Gameplay centers around catering to customers to gather as much money as possible. Flo can be moved around the restaurant to complete tasks. As customers arrive in the restaurant, the player must drag and drop them onto a table, where they sit down and read menus. Then the player must guide Flo to the table to take their order, which must be taken to the service hatch. After the chef has prepared the meal, Flo must deliver the food. When the customers are finished eating, they must be taken a check, at which point the customers leave a tip and their dishes on the table, departing the restaurant. The dishes must be cleared by Flo before the next set of customers can use the table. Each successful action earns the player points, performing the same action multiple times in a row earns the player a chain bonus, which is broken once a different action is performed.

Customers have a series of hearts over their heads that indicate their mood. The longer the customer is forced to wait, the more hearts he or she loses. Each type of customer has different degrees of patience and tipping habits. Flo can perform various actions, such as talking to customers or serving them drinks, to revive these hearts. When customers lose all their hearts, they leave the restaurant, costing the player points. The goal of a level is to earn a certain number of points. There are also expert point totals for advanced players to achieve.

The game has two modes: Career mode, which follows the story of Flo, and Endless Shift, a survival mode in which the player must last as long as possible in a single level.

In the Cooking Dash variation, the player actually prepares the food as opposed to bringing the order to the chef for him to prepare it.

Reception
Diner Dash has been mentioned in The New York Times, USA Today, CNN, and a variety of casual game studies, including Nicole Lazzaro's analysis of player emotions at the 2005 Game Developers Conference. Games Magazine gave it a favorable review, calling it "remarkably flexible".

References

External links
 archived
Glu Mobile, mobile version archived 

2003 video games
Cancelled Game Boy Advance games
Casual games
IOS games
Lua (programming language)-scripted video games
MacOS games
Mobile games
Nintendo DS games
PlayStation Portable games
PlayStation Network games
Video games about food and drink
Video games developed in the United States
Video games featuring female protagonists
Video games scored by Adam Gubman
WiiWare games
Windows games
Xbox 360 Live Arcade games
Android (operating system) games
Time management video games
PlayFirst games
Glu Mobile games
Single-player video games